Aerangis citrata is an epiphytic species of orchid indigenous to Madagascar.

References

Endemic flora of Madagascar
Epiphytic orchids
Plants described in 1822
citrata